Legislative elections were held in French Polynesia on 22 April and 6 May 2018. On 22 April 2018, voters cast their ballots in the first round of the election to the Assembly of French Polynesia. A second round was held on 6 May 2018 for the three political parties that exceeded 12.5 percent of the vote in the first round. The new Tapura Huiraatira party emerged as the largest in the Assembly, winning 38 of the 57 seats.

Background

The Tahoera'a Huiraatira party, an anti-independence party led by Gaston Flosse, previously won 38 of the 57 seats in the Assembly in the 2013 general election. However, the governing Tahoera'a Huiraatira has been plagued by infighting and internal splits since 2013. Some former Tahoera'a Huiraatira members set up a new political party, which has since merged with the only other anti-independence party in the Assembly. Notably, Assembly Speaker Marcel Tuihani quit Tahoera'a Huiraatira in June 2017, and set up a rival party.

All French Polynesian political parties must alternate between male and female candidates to encourage a gender balance among legislative candidates.

The French High Commissioner of French Polynesia René Bidal announced the vote registration for the territorial election will be open from 12 March to 26 March 2018.

Electoral system 
The 57 members of the Assembly of French Polynesia are elected by a proportional multi-member list of two rounds, with a majority premium. Polynesia is a single constituency whose communes make up of eight sub-divisions called sections, each with a majority premium of 1 to 4 seats according to their population for a total of 19 premium seats.

Each list presents 73 candidates in the eight sections. Each list is composed alternately of a candidate of each sex. In the first round, the list having received an absolute majority of votes in its section is awarded the majority bonus, then the remaining seats are distributed proportionally among all the lists having crossed the electoral threshold of 5% of the votes according to the method of voting. If no list obtains more than 50% of the votes cast, a second round is held between all the lists having collected more than 12.5% of the votes, those having collected between 5% and 12.5% being able to merge with the lists that have been maintained. The leading list then gets the majority bonus, and the remaining seats are distributed proportionally under the same conditions.

The lists may be reimbursed for part of their campaign costs if they reach the threshold of 3% of the votes cast in the first round, provided that they comply with accounting transparency requirements and legislation on the format of documents.

Party participation
In December 2017, France's ruling party, En Marche, which was founded by French President Emmanuel Macron, announced that it would contest the French Polynesian legislative election in 2018 for the first time. Efforts at forming a coalition involving En Marche and other known political figures in the territory, under the name Here Fenua, reportedly failed in February 2018.

In February 2018, Oscar Temaru, leader of Tavini Huiraatira, said he will not rule out his party boycotting the election.

Banned candidates
Former President of French Polynesia Gaston Flosse will not be allowed to stand for election in April 2018. He is not allowed to hold public office due to two convictions for public corruption in 2014 and 2016. Despite Flosse's claims he can stand in the election, based on advice given by his lawyers, an election court in Tahiti upheld the election ban against Flosse in January 2018.

Results

By section

See also
 List of members of the Assembly of French Polynesia (2018–2023)

References

French Polynesia
2018 in French Polynesia
French Polynesia
French Polynesia
Elections in French Polynesia
French Polynesia
French Polynesia